The women's halfpipe event in snowboarding at the 2002 Winter Olympics was held in Park City, United States. The competition took place on 10 February 2002.

Medalists

Results

The halfpipe event for women took place on 11 February 2002, both the qualification rounds and the finals taking place on that day. Fortythirty snowboarders took part in the qualification, the top twelve of whom move on to the finals.

In the qualification round, each snowboarder was given two runs to be in the top six of that run. Regardless of how many points the person received, as long as they placed in the top six, they advanced to the finals. If the person qualified in the first run, they did not need to do a second run in the qualification. The finals proceeded in a similar fashion. The twelve qualifiers had two runs in which to score the highest possible points. The snowboarders were ranked by their highest score, and medals were awarded accordingly. The following is a table detailing the results of the qualification and finals runs of the competing snowboarders.

References

Snowboarding at the 2002 Winter Olympics
2002 in snowboarding
2002 in women's sport
Women's events at the 2002 Winter Olympics